Pinkhill railway station was a railway station in Edinburgh, Scotland. It served Edinburgh Zoo, east Corstorphine and Murrayfield. Services were provided by trains on the Corstorphine Branch of the Edinburgh and Glasgow Railway.

History

The station was opened by the North British Railway and the line passed on to the Scottish Region of British Railways on nationalisation in 1948. It was closed by the British Railways Board in 1968.

The disused track bed is now a cycle and footpath, forming part of the City of Edinburgh's Quiet Route 9. The platforms and ticket office of the former station remain in place.

References

Notes

Sources 
 
 
 

Disused railway stations in Edinburgh
Railway stations in Great Britain opened in 1902
Railway stations in Great Britain closed in 1917
Railway stations in Great Britain opened in 1919
Railway stations in Great Britain closed in 1968
Former North British Railway stations
Corstorphine
Edinburgh Zoo